Trigun is a Japanese manga series written and illustrated by Yasuhiro Nightow. It revolves around a man known as "Vash the Stampede" and two Bernardelli Insurance Society employees, Meryl Stryfe and Milly Thompson, who follow him around in order to minimize the damages inevitably caused by his appearance. Nightow, first published a one-shot of Trigun in Tokuma Shoten's shōnen manga magazine  in February 1995; it began its regular serialization in the same magazine two months later in April. Monthly Shōnen Captain ceased publication in January 1997, and the series was put on hiatus. Tokuma Shoten collected the Trigun chapters in three tankōbon volumes, released from April 25, 1996, to January 20, 1999; Shōnen Gahōsha republished the Trigun chapters in two volumes, released on June 2, 2000.

The manga resumed its publication in Shōnen Gahōsha's seinen manga magazine Young King OURs, under the title , in October 1997. Trigun Maximum finished in March 2007. Shōnen Gahōsha collected its chapters in fourteen tankōbon volumes, released from May 23, 1998, to February 27, 2008.

In North America, the manga was licensed by Dark Horse Comics, who announced its publication in June 2003; they released the two volumes of Trigun, based on the Shōnen Gahosha's edition, on October 15, 2003, and January 7, 2004. In March 2004, Dark Horse Comics announced that they would also publish Trigun Maximum; the fourteen volumes were released from May 26, 2004, to April 8, 2009. In September 2012, Dark Horse Comics announced that they would release the series in an omnibus edition; Trigun was released in a single volume on October 9, 2013; Trigun Maximum was released in five volumes from November 21, 2012, to November 5, 2014.

An anthology manga titled Trigun: Multiple Bullets, featuring short stories written by several manga artists such as Boichi, Masakazu Ishiguru, Satoshi Mizukami, Ark Performance, Yusuke Takeyama, Yuga Takauchi, and Akira Sagami, was released by Shōnen Gahosha in Japan on December 28, 2011. The volume was released by Dark Horse Comics on March 6, 2013.

Volume list

Trigun

Original release
Published in three volumes by Tokuma Shoten

Reprint
Reprinted in two volumes by Shōnen Gahōsha, translated by Dark Horse Comics and Digital Manga Publishing.

Trigun Maximum
Published by Shōnen Gahōsha, translated by Dark Horse Comics.

Notes

References

 
Trigun